Prochyliza nigrimana is a species of cheese skippers, insects in the family Piophilidae.

References

Piophilidae
Articles created by Qbugbot
Insects described in 1826